Sefidar Rural District is a rural district (dehestan) in Khafr County, Fars Province, Iran. At the 2006 census, its population was 4,214, in 1,112 families.  The rural district has 14 villages.

References 

Rural Districts of Fars Province
Jahrom County